Burges Salmon LLP is a law firm based in Bristol, England.

About Burges Salmon
Burges Salmon is a UK law firm with a national and international client base, including FTSE-listed companies, government departments, public bodies, executives and individuals.

The firm operates throughout the UK and in all major European and international jurisdictions. Burges Salmon works with independent law firms around the world to meet clients' international needs. The firm currently has 79 partners and has sector expertise in a range of areas including energy, transport, food and farming, real estate, financial services and infrastructure. Burges Salmon's turnover for the 2012 / 2013 financial year was £73.7 million, with an operating profit of £23.5m and profit per equity partner of £423,000.

The firm undertakes corporate responsibility, and collaborates with organisations to contribute to three main areas: community, education and environment. The firm was a founder member of the Legal Sector Alliance.

In 2012, Burges Salmon chose the Bristol Children's Hospital charity, Wallace & Gromit's Grand Appeal, as its charity of the year - raising £84,000 to help support the expansion of the hospital.

In 2013, the firm became a founding sponsor of Aardman and The Grand Appeal's Gromit Unleashed public art exhibition – sponsoring Aardman's Gromit sculpture at London Paddington station.

The firm publishes an annual review called Insight.

History
The origins of the firm go back to 1841 when Edward Burges set up as a sole practitioner. His father and grandfather had both been lawyers before him.

Following the death of the founder in 1890, the practice was continued by his son W. E. Parry Burges who formed a partnership with a Mr Sloan, resulting in the name becoming Burges & Sloan. In 1947 the partnership was joined by Stuart Evans, who was then practising alone as Salmon, Cumberland and Evans. The firm's move to Narrow Quay House in 1982 saw the shortening of the name to "Burges Salmon".

In 2010 Burges Salmon re-located from Narrow Quay to its current head office at One Glass Wharf in the Bristol Temple Quarter Enterprise Zone. In 2012, the firm also moved its London offices from Chancery Exchange to New Street Square, enabling it to operate from both Bristol and London.

The firm's recent history has been working in sectors including energy, transport, food, farming and land, real estate, financial services and infrastructure. Burges Salmon has authored a number of publications including the Burges Salmon Guide to Nuclear Law and the Burges Salmon Guide for Landowners and Farmers, also known as The Pink Book.

In 2008, allegations were made against Burges Salmon that sub-prime loans may have been mis-sold to farmers, and was investigated by the Solicitors Regulation Authority. In October 2010 the Solicitors Regulation Authority announced that it had closed the investigation with no further action.

Notable deals / cases in 2013
Advised longstanding client FirstGroup on the sale of eight of its London bus depots in a deal worth around £80m
Helped the Discovery Channel to successfully defend a fierce trade mark and passing off challenge by AETN.
Advised Business Growth Fund as it invested £3.9 million to support growth for travel product pioneer Trunki.
Represented Eurostar in a case which set new standards in complex procurement and rail disputes.
Advised Leeds United F.C. on a test case which saw West Yorkshire Police ultimately lose an appeal relating to charges for match day policing.
Advised the Competition Commission on the corporate aspects of the sale of Edinburgh Airport for £807.2m at the end of April 2012.
Advised longstanding client Milk Link on its merger with Danish dairy giant Arla Foods, creating one of the first ever mergers between a UK and a foreign co-operative.
Advised Cardiff City Transport Limited (trading as Cardiff Bus) in its successful defence of a major claim brought by a competitor before the Competition Appeal Tribunal.

Industry Awards
Lawyer Awards 2013

Competition Team of the Year – Runner-up

Litigation Team of the Year - Shortlisted

Corporate Restructuring Team of the Year - Shortlisted

Private Wealth Team of the Year - Shortlisted
Insider South West Dealmakers Awards 2013

Corporate Law Firm of the Year - Winner
European Pensions Awards 2013

European Pensions Law Firm of the Year - Shortlisted
Knowlist Awards 2013

IT Team Achievement Award - Winner
Legal Business Awards 2013

Competition Team of the Year – Shortlisted

Energy & Natural Resources Team of the Year – Shortlisted
British Legal Awards 2012

Commercial Team of the Year – Winner – for work with the NDA on the decommissioning of Dounreay

Litigation and Regulatory Team of the Year – Shortlisted
Bristol Law Society Awards

Law Firm of the Year – Winner (national category)
The Lawyer Awards 2012

Competition / Regulatory Team of the Year – Joint Winner
LawCareers.net Awards

Best Trainee Solicitor Recruiter - national firm winner for seventh consecutive year

References

External links

 Profile in Chambers UK and the Chambers Student Guide
 Burges Salmon talks the talk, The Lawyer, 26 March 2008
Lorraine Cushnie, Burges Salmon assists FirstGroup with rail triumph. The Lawyer, 15-Dec-2005

Law firms of the United Kingdom
Companies based in Bristol
Law firms established in 1841
1841 establishments in the United Kingdom